Iterative deepening A* (IDA*) is a graph traversal and path search algorithm that can find the shortest path between a designated start node and any member of a set of goal nodes in a weighted graph. It is a variant of iterative deepening depth-first search that borrows the idea to use a heuristic function to evaluate the remaining cost to get to the goal from the A* search algorithm. Since it is a depth-first search algorithm, its memory usage is lower than in A*, but unlike ordinary iterative deepening search, it concentrates on exploring the most promising nodes and thus does not go to the same depth everywhere in the search tree. Unlike A*, IDA* does not utilize dynamic programming and therefore often ends up exploring the same nodes many times.

The algorithm was first described by Richard Korf in 1985.

Description 

Iterative-deepening-A* works as follows: at each iteration, perform a depth-first search, cutting off a branch when its total cost  exceeds a given threshold. This threshold starts at the estimate of the cost at the initial state, and increases for each iteration of the algorithm. At each iteration, the threshold used for the next iteration is the minimum cost of all values that exceeded the current threshold.

As in A*, the heuristic has to have particular properties to guarantee optimality (shortest paths). See Properties below.

Pseudocode 

 path              current search path (acts like a stack)
 node              current node (last node in current path)
 g                 the cost to reach current node
 f                 estimated cost of the cheapest path (root..node..goal)
 h(node)           estimated cost of the cheapest path (node..goal)
 cost(node, succ)  step cost function
 is_goal(node)     goal test
 successors(node)  node expanding function, expand nodes ordered by g + h(node)
 ida_star(root)    return either NOT_FOUND or a pair with the best path and its cost
  
 procedure ida_star(root)
     bound := h(root)
     path := [root]
     loop
         t := search(path, 0, bound)
         if t = FOUND then return (path, bound)
         if t = ∞ then return NOT_FOUND
         bound := t
     end loop
 end procedure
 
 function search(path, g, bound)
     node := path.last
     f := g + h(node)
     if f > bound then return f
     if is_goal(node) then return FOUND
     min := ∞
     for succ in successors(node) do
         if succ not in path then
             path.push(succ)
             t := search(path, g + cost(node, succ), bound)
             if t = FOUND then return FOUND
             if t < min then min := t
             path.pop()
         end if
     end for
     return min
 end function

Properties

Like A*, IDA* is guaranteed to find the shortest path leading from the given start node to any goal node in the problem graph, if the heuristic function  is admissible, that is

IDA* is beneficial when the problem is memory constrained. A* search keeps a large queue of unexplored nodes that can quickly fill up memory. By contrast, because IDA* does not remember any node except the ones on the current path, it requires an amount of memory that is only linear in the length of the solution that it constructs. Its time complexity is analyzed by Korf et al. under the assumption that the heuristic cost estimate  is consistent, meaning that

Recursive best-first search is another memory-constrained version of A* search that can be faster in practice than IDA*, since it requires less regenerating of nodes.

Applications 

Applications of IDA* are found in such problems as planning.

References

Graph algorithms
Routing algorithms
Search algorithms
Game artificial intelligence
Articles with example pseudocode